Brian Keith Cole II (born April 3, 1997) is a gridiron football linebacker for the Winnipeg Blue Bombers of the Canadian Football League (CFL). He played college football at Mississippi State.

College career
Cole grew up in Saginaw, Michigan and played three games at Michigan as a wide receiver and on special teams. He was released from the team in January 2016. Cole transferred to East Mississippi Community College and switched to defense, compiling 54 tackles, with 3 forced fumbles, 3 blocked kicks, a sack, and a fumble returned for a touchdown. He came to Mississippi State and sat out a season as an academic redshirt. During his junior season, he played five games before a torn pectoral muscle ended his season after five games As a senior in 2019, Cole tallied  67 tackles, 7.5 tackles for loss, 2 sacks, 2 pass breakups, and one interception.

Professional career

Minnesota Vikings
Cole was selected by the Minnesota Vikings in the seventh round with the 249th pick of the 2020 NFL Draft. He was placed on the reserve/COVID-19 list by the Vikings on July 27, 2020, and activated from the list on eight days later. He was waived on August 26, 2020.

Miami Dolphins
On September 7, 2020, Cole was signed to the Miami Dolphins' practice squad. He signed a reserve/future contract with the Dolphins on January 5, 2021. He was waived on July 16, 2021.

Carolina Panthers
On August 5, 2021, Cole was signed by the Carolina Panthers. He was waived on August 27, 2021.

Saskatchewan Roughriders
Cole was signed by the Saskatchewan Roughriders on February 2, 2022, but was released with the final training camp cuts on June 5, 2022.

Edmonton Elks
Cole was added to the practice roster of the Edmonton Elks on June 28, 2022. However, he was released from the practice roster on July 10, 2022.

Winnipeg Blue Bombers
On July 13, 2022, Cole signed a practice roster agreement with the Winnipeg Blue Bombers.

References

External links
Winnipeg Blue Bombers bio
Mississippi State Bulldogs bio

1997 births
Living people
Players of American football from Michigan
Sportspeople from Saginaw, Michigan
American football wide receivers
American football linebackers
American football safeties
Michigan Wolverines football players
East Mississippi Lions football players
Mississippi State Bulldogs football players
Minnesota Vikings players
Miami Dolphins players
Carolina Panthers players
Saskatchewan Roughriders players
Edmonton Elks players
Winnipeg Blue Bombers players